git-annex is a distributed file synchronization system written in Haskell. It aims to solve the problem of sharing and synchronizing collections of large files independent from a commercial service or even a central server.

History 
The development of git-annex began in 2010. In 2012-13 the development was funded through a Kickstarter campaign. The main development of this campaign was the git-annex assistant, a component that runs in the background to automate the synchronization of repositories.

The next crowd funding campaign for 2013-14 was organized over a self-hosted platform.

Design 
git-annex uses Git to index files but does not store them in the Git history. Instead, a symbolic link representing and linking to the probably large file is committed. git-annex manages a content-addressable storage for the files under its control. A separate Git branch logs the location of every file. Thus users can clone a git-annex repository and then decide for every file whether to make it locally available.

Availability 
git-annex packages are available for a variety of operating systems, including:
 Debian
 Ubuntu
 Fedora
 FreeBSD
 Arch Linux
 NixOS
 Guix
 Gentoo
 OpenBSD
 Android
 macOS (via Homebrew)
 Windows

References

External links 
 Git-annex home page

2010 software
Free version control software
Free software programmed in Haskell
Self-hosting software
Distributed version control systems
Git (software)